Frederick Roger Imhof (August 15, 1875 – April 15, 1958) was an American film actor, vaudeville, burlesque and circus performer, sketch writer, and songwriter.

Early years
Imhof was born in Rock Island, Illinois on April 15, 1875 to Nicholas Imhoff, from Switzerland, and Susan McCluen Imhoff, from Ireland.

Career 
Imhof began his career as a clown with the Mills Orton Circus, and as an "Irish" comedian. He "toured in vaudeville and burlesque between 1895 and 1930." By 1897, he was "teamed with Charles Osborne in a comedy contortion and burlesque acrobatics act." Around this time, he dropped an "f" from his last name.

In the 1902–1903 season, he first worked with longtime vaudeville partner Hugh Conn, an association that lasted into the 1920s or possibly 1930s. Marcel Corinne (died 1977), sometimes spelled Coreene, joined the act sometime in the 1910s. She and Imhof married in 1913.  The trio of Imhof, Conn and Corinne toured in two comic sketches, "The Pest House" and "Surgeon Louder, U.S.A.", the latter "a military comedy" Imhof had written. "The Pest House" was "the most popular and longest running of several sketches starring the portly pair Roger Imhof and Marcel Corinne". According to an October 1920 edition of the Oregon Daily Journal, the sketch involved Imhof playing an Irish peddler who spends a mishap-filled night at an inn. In 1923, he appeared in the Broadway play Jack and Jill.

He reportedly invested in Chicago and Los Angeles real estate, but lost most of his money in the stock market and during the Great Depression.

He became involved early on in the nascent Hollywood film industry, apparently "as a presenter, promoter, or agent". As an actor, he appeared in films from 1932 to 1944, including San Francisco (1936), Drums Along the Mohawk (1939), The Grapes of Wrath (1940) and This Gun for Hire (1942).

Of the songs he composed, eleven are extant, including the 1906 "Old Broadway".

Imhof died on April 15, 1958, and was buried in Valhalla Memorial Park Cemetery.

Papers
Collections of his papers and other material are held by the Green Library (Special Collections M0611), Department of Special Collections, Stanford University, and the Spencer Research Library (MS 121), University of Kansas.

Partial filmography

Me and My Gal (1932) - Down and Outer (uncredited)
Paddy the Next Best Thing (1933) - Micky
Charlie Chan's Greatest Case (1933) - The Beachcomber
Hoop-La (1933) - Colonel Gowdy
David Harum (1934) - Edwards
Ever Since Eve (1934) - Dave Martin
Sleepers East (1934) - MacGowan
Wild Gold (1934) - James 'Pop' Benson
Grand Canary (1934) - Jimmie Corcoran
Handy Andy (1934) - Doc Burmeister
Judge Priest (1934) - Billy Gaynor
Love Time (1934) - Innkeeper
Music in the Air (1934) - Burgomaster
Under Pressure (1935) - George Breck
One More Spring (1935) - Mr. Sweeney
Life Begins at 40 (1935) - Pappy Smithers
George White's 1935 Scandals (1935) - Officer Riley (uncredited)
The Farmer Takes a Wife (1935) - Samson 'Sam' Weaver
Steamboat Round the Bend (1935) - Pappy
Riffraff (1936) - 'Pops'
Three Godfathers (1936) - Sheriff
Roaming Lady (1936) - Captain Murchison
San Francisco (1936) - Alaska
A Son Comes Home (1936) - Detective Kennedy
In His Steps (1936) - Adams
North of Nome (1936) - Judge Bridle
Red Lights Ahead (1936) - Pa Wallace
Girl Loves Boy (1937) - Charles Conrad
Sweetheart of the Navy (1937) - Commander Lodge
High, Wide, and Handsome (1937) - Pop Bowers
There Goes the Groom (1937) - Hank
Every Day's a Holiday (1937) - Trigger Mike
The Adventures of Huckleberry Finn (1939) - Judge Logan at Jim's Trial (uncredited)
Tell No Tales (1939) - Taxi Driver (uncredited)
Nancy Drew... Trouble Shooter (1939) - Sheriff Barney Riggs
They Shall Have Music (1939) - Michael - Deputy (uncredited)
No Place to Go (1939) - Old Soldier (uncredited)
Drums Along the Mohawk (1939) - Gen. Nicholas Herkimer
Abe Lincoln in Illinois (1940) - Mr. Crimmin
The Grapes of Wrath (1940) - Mr. Thomas
Little Old New York (1940) - John Jacob Astor
I Was an Adventuress (1940) - Henrich Von Korgen
The Way of All Flesh (1940) - Franz Henzel
Lady with Red Hair (1940) - Pat - the Lamplighter (uncredited)
Victory (1940) - Captain Davidson (uncredited)
The Lady from Cheyenne (1941) - Uncle Bill
Man Hunt (1941) - Captain Jensen
Mystery Ship (1941) - Capt. Randall
This Woman is Mine (1941) - John Jacob Astor (replaced by Sig Ruman) (uncredited)
This Gun for Hire (1942) - Senator Burnett
It Happened in Flatbush (1942) - Mr. Maguire
Tennessee Johnson (1942) - Hannibal Hamlin (uncredited)
Casanova in Burlesque (1944) - Joseph M. Kelly Sr.
Home in Indiana (1944) - Roger - Old Timer (uncredited)
Wilson (1944) - Minor Role (uncredited) (final film role)

See also
List of vaudeville performers: A–K

References

External links

1875 births
1958 deaths
American male film actors
American burlesque performers
Vaudeville performers
People from Rock Island, Illinois
Male actors from Illinois
Burials at Valhalla Memorial Park Cemetery
American circus performers
American clowns
Songwriters from Illinois
20th-century American male actors